Ataman Güneyligil (born 6 September 1981) is a Turkish volleyball coach. He's been coaching Turkish side Galatasaray since 2015.

Career

Galatasaray
Güneyligil was appointed as the head coach of the Galatasaray Women's Volleyball Team on 20 August 2015.

On 3 August 2022, Galatasaray signed a new 2-year contract with Head Coach Güneyligil.

References

External links
 Coach profile at WorldofVolley.com 
 Coach profile at Volleybox.net
 Coach profile at Galatasaray.org

1981 births
Living people
Sportspeople from Istanbul
Galatasaray S.K. (women's volleyball) coaches
Turkish volleyball coaches